The development of the money market in the euro area or the euro money market made its inception with very low rates of interest.

Turnover of the euro money market
The total turnover of the euro money market was moribund in the second quarter of 2004 although there was a huge surge in the turnover in the second quarter of 2003. Such developments were discontinuous across the market. After this upturn in all the market segments in the second quarter of 2003, there was a sharp downturn in the interest rate, cross currency and FX swaps in the second quarter of 2004. This was contrasted by a rise in the turnover in the unsecured, secured and other interest rate swaps. The forward rate agreement and the short term securities also witnessed a rise. The secured segment happens to be the largest money market segment.

The overnight interest rate swap segment also saw a sharp downfall in the second quarter of 2004 although it had experienced a strong rise in the second quarter of 2003. this change is attributed to the interest rate speculation which was high in 2003 but low in 2004. The overnight interest rate swap segment of the money market is provided impetus by the EUIRIBOR-ACI.

The unsecured, secured and the overnight interest rate swap and the FX swap segments are characterized by activities that have very short term maturity periods. The instruments like the cross currency and other interest rate swaps are the money market instruments that are traded at long maturities.

Structure of the euro money market
In regard to structure, the euro money market has been less concentrated over the past years. But differences across the various money market segments continue to exist. The market that is least concentrated is the unsecured money market segment. The money market segments that are highly condensed are the forward rate agreement, other interest rate agreement and the cross currency swap segments. They constitute about 70% of the entire money market share.

The euro money market products are short term deposits, repos, EONIA swaps and foreign exchange swaps. There is an increase in the liquidity in these money market instruments that is projected by the thinning in the bid–offer spread.

Transactions in the euro money market
Transactions in the euro money market occur mainly through the electronic mode. The secured market segment experiences that largest electronic mode of transaction.

See also
 Euro Interbank Offered Rate
 Eonia

External links
For details on the euro money market the websites worth viewing are ecb.int, euribor.org, euromoney.com, moneycentral.msn etc.

Money markets
Eurozone
Reference rates